The spiny Ceram rat (Rattus feliceus) is a species of rodent in the family Muridae.
It is found only in Seram, Indonesia, which it is named after.

References

Rattus
Rats of Asia
Endemic fauna of Indonesia
Rodents of Indonesia
Mammals described in 1920
Taxa named by Oldfield Thomas
Taxonomy articles created by Polbot